= Outside backs =

Outside backs is used to describe several playing positions in the sports of rugby league and rugby union:

- Outside backs (rugby league), the threequarters, i.e. the wings, and centres in rugby league football
- Outside backs (rugby union), the three-quarters, i.e. the wings, and centres in rugby union football
